Circle of Deceit (German title: Die Fälschung; French title: Le Faussaire) is an anti-war film directed by Volker Schlöndorff and internationally released in 1981. An international co-production, it was an adaptation of Nicolas Born's novel of the same name, which had appeared in 1979. The film follows a German journalist sent to Beirut to report on the Lebanese Civil War, which had begun in 1975.

Cast
Bruno Ganz as Georg Laschen
Hanna Schygulla as Ariane Nassar
Jerzy Skolimowski as Hoffmann
Jean Carmet as Rudnik
Gila von Weitershausen as Greta Laschen
Khaled El Sayed as Progressive Officer (uncredited)

Story
Journalist Georg Laschen (Bruno Ganz) is sent to Beirut, where he is supposed to report on the local civil war.  His feelings about this mission are influenced by the fact that his marriage to his wife Greta (Gila von Weitershausen) back home is dysfunctional, and the conflict in Lebanon remains incomprehensible to him.

He feels that his comments and his own problems to understand the situation don't really count because violence sells anyway. Subsequently he feels that his reports aren't real journalism and by pretending to be that they can downright be considered deceit (or in German: Fälschung).

After a fling with a local lady named Arianna (Hanna Schygulla) he happens to kill a man. He realises how relatively easily one's moral standards can be corrupted in a violent environment and how hard or even impossible it is to remain unbiased as a journalist.

Production
The film was shot on location in Beirut. The Lebanese Civil War, which began in 1975, would continue until 1990. The New York Times remarked that it was "filmed in 1980 under remarkable conditions: with its crew confined to "safe" portions of Beirut while the fighting went on elsewhere, but with ubiquitous evidence of real warfare everywhere."

Reception
The New York Times described it as "a balanced, thoughtful, extremely moving vision of wartime tragedy."

Awards
The film was nominated for the César Award for Best Foreign Film in 1981. Jerzy Skolimowski won the Best Supporting Actor Deutscher Filmpreis in 1982, for his role as the war photographer Hoffmann.

Discography 
The original soundtrack music composed by  Maurice Jarre for Le Faussaire was released on CD in 2013 by Canadian label Disques Cinemusique. More information here.

References

External links

The Culturist on "Circle of Deceit"

1981 films
1980s war drama films
Anti-war films
Films about journalists
Films about war correspondents
Films based on German novels
Films directed by Volker Schlöndorff
French war drama films
German war drama films
1980s German-language films
Lebanese drama films
Lebanese Civil War films
West German films
Films produced by Anatole Dauman
1980s political drama films
1981 drama films
1980s French films
1980s German films